Putthipong Assaratanakul (also known as Billkin, born 8 October 1999) is a Thai actor and singer. He is known for his roles as Tao in My Ambulance (2019) and as Teh in I Told Sunset About You (2020) and I Promised You the Moon (2021).

Early life and education 
Putthipong was born in Bangkok, Thailand. His father initially considered giving him the nickname "Eeyore" (he has elder siblings named Mickey and Winnie) but later changed it to "Bill". One day, his four-year-old brother called him "Billkin", and the name was adopted. He completed his secondary education at Saint Gabriel's College. He is studying business administration (international program), major in marketing at the Faculty of Commerce and Accountancy at Thammasat University, having enrolled in 2018.

Career 
Putthipong started in the entertainment industry as an actor under Nadao Bangkok. He is one of the main hosts of Love Missions (2016), an online show by Good Day Entertainment. He did some runway modeling and acting such as in Please... Siang Riak Winyan (2017). He rose to popularity with his role as Doctor Tao in My Ambulance (2019) where he was paired with Krit Amnuaydechkorn (PP), who played the role of Tewkao. With the conclusion of the said television series in October 2019, plans were made to produce a boys' love television series where Putthipong and Krit will play as lead actors. The project, with a working title of "BKPP: The Series", was announced in February 2020 and was supposed to premiere in July 2020. Due to government restrictions placed amidst the COVID-19 pandemic, the series' production was delayed with its release pushed to October 2020 under the title of I Told Sunset About You. Putthipong played the role of Teh, a high-school student from Phuket and a childhood friend of Krit's character Oh-aew. The series returned for a second season in May 2021 entitled I Promised You the Moon.

Aside from acting, he also sang "You Are My Everything", the official soundtrack of My Ambulance. This later led him to release his first single under Nadao Music entitled "Hug in Mind" which featured his fellow Nadao Bangkok artist JAYLERR. He also sang for the original soundtrack of I Told Sunset About You and I Promised You The Moon. His second single, "IXO" and its music video was released on 9 September 2021. The single is described as a mix of soul and city pop genres. Putthipong was involved from the conceptualization stage to the writing of the song's chorus part.

Filmography

Film

Television

Music video

Discography

As lead artist

As collaborating artist

Awards and nomination

References

External links 
 
 
 

1999 births
Living people
Putthipong Assaratanakul
Putthipong Assaratanakul
Putthipong Assaratanakul
Putthipong Assaratanakul
Putthipong Assaratanakul